Jane Clayson Johnson (born April 25, 1967) is an American journalist and author.

Early life and career 
Clayson was born in Sacramento, California, and spent most of her childhood there. She played with the Sacramento Youth Symphony and is an accomplished violinist.

She graduated from Brigham Young University in Provo, Utah, in 1990 with a degree in journalism.

Clayson began her career at KSL-TV in Salt Lake City, Utah (1990–96). While at KSL, she traveled to China to write and produce a series of stories about American doctors assisting Chinese children with disabilities. Her work there earned a regional Emmy. She also received the Radio and Television News Directors of America's Edward R. Murrow Award while at KSL.

ABC News 
In 1996, Clayson moved to Los Angeles, California, where she worked as a correspondent for Good Morning America, World News Tonight, and other ABC News broadcasts. Her work included coverage of Senator Bob Dole's 1996 presidential campaign, the O.J. Simpson civil trial, and NATO's strikes against Kosovo and the resulting refugee crisis in Macedonia.

The Early Show and CBS News 
In 1999, CBS News launched "Operation Glass Slipper," the widely publicized search for Bryant Gumbel's co-host on The Early Show. On November 1, 1999, Clayson was chosen, and joined Gumbel for the show's first broadcast. From 1999 to 2002, she anchored The Early Show through the new millennium, the inauguration of President George W. Bush, and the attacks on September 11, 2001.

Clayson may be best known for her awkward confrontation with Early Show food and style contributor Martha Stewart during this period; Stewart was involved in the ImClone stock trading case, but retained her Early Show contributor duties during the initial stages of the controversy. CBS required Stewart to address the issue as a condition of keeping those contributor duties. Stewart, upon consulting her legal team, agreed to take questions on air, but not in a separate interview. As a result, during one of Stewart's usual live cooking segments (in June 2002), Clayson, who normally assisted Stewart with preparing the meal, asked her to comment on her involvement with ImClone and her selling of ImClone stock just one day before an application for a new ImClone cancer drug was rejected; a visibly uncomfortable Stewart, obsessively chopping vegetables for a salad, evaded Clayson's questions, citing her inability to comment on an ongoing investigation. (Stewart was indicted in 2003, tried and convicted in 2004, and served five months in federal prison for her involvement in the case.) Stewart stopped contributing to the program after the appearance, which was immortalized in an NBC TV-movie of Stewart's life a few months later (with Cybill Shepherd playing the role of Stewart).

In 2002, Clayson became a correspondent for CBS News. She regularly reported for "Eye on America" segments and contributed to both 48 Hours and CBS Evening News.

Personal life 
Clayson is the eldest of three children. In 1986, her younger brother, David, died of a brain tumour. Her father was a vascular surgeon and her mother a homemaker.

In September 2003, Clayson married Mark W. Johnson, a graduate of the U.S. Naval Academy, Columbia University (with a master's degree in civil engineering and engineering mechanics) and Harvard Business School. They were first introduced to each other by Clayson's sister.  Johnson had joined the Church of Jesus Christ of Latter-day Saints (LDS Church), of which Clayson was already a member, not long before they first met.  Clayson left CBS three months later (December 2003) to join her husband in Boston, where he was for a time president of the management consulting firm, Innosight, which he co-founded with Clayton M. Christensen.

The couple have two children, and have also raised three children from Mark's previous marriage.

I Am a Mother! 
Johnson, under her professional name, Jane Clayson, was the primary fill-in host on the public radio program On Point, when previous regular host Tom Ashbrook was absent. She has produced specials for the Discovery Channel. She also hosted BYU TV's coverage of the funeral for LDS Church president Gordon B. Hinckley on February 2, 2008.

Her first book, I Am a Mother!, was released in March 2007 and chronicles her decision to leave the network news business to have a family. She regularly speaks on the topic at events across the United States.

References

External links
 Irene Sege, "Jane Clayson Johnson Left It All Behind to Have a Baby," Boston Globe, October 12, 2004. (Accessed March 24, 2007.)
 Official CBS News bio. (Accessed March 24, 2007.)
 Jane Clayson Johnson, "I Am a Mother," 2006 Conference on the Family, American Mothers, Inc.  (Accessed March 24, 2007.)
 March for Babies - PSA <https://www.youtube.com/watch?v=iQ1CsZbjY0g> 2008 March of Dimes

1967 births
Living people
Latter Day Saints from Massachusetts
Brigham Young University alumni
Writers from Sacramento, California
American women journalists
CBS News people
Latter Day Saints from California
Latter Day Saints from Utah